Jeong Hyeon-mo 정현모(鄭顯模), October 10, 1894 – January 1, 1965) was a Korean politician, journalist, businessman, and independence activist.

Education 

Graduate, Hyeopdong School and Bosung Middle School, Korea 
Bachelor of Arts graduate, School of Political Science and Economics at Waseda University, Japan

Career 

 Managing Editor, Shidae Ilbo  
 President and founding board member, Shinganhoe Andong-city branch (August 1927 - 1929)  
 Managing Editor, Chosun Ilbo 
 Business executive 
 Member of the Constituent Assembly, Republic of Korea Government (Andong-city B-district electee; May 10, 1948)
 First Governor, Gyeongsangbuk-do Government, Republic of Korea (October 8, 1948 - January 23, 1950) 
 First Director of Party Affairs, Liberal Party, Republic of Korea (December 1951 - September 1952) 
 Fourth Governor, Chungcheongbuk-do Government, Republic of Korea (September 1952 - November 1953) 
 First Chairman of the Board, Shilla Foundation of Education, Republic of Korea (July 1954 - 1957)  
 Founding member, Minwoo Party, Republic of Korea (1962)

Awards and honors 
Recipient of Order of Civil Merit – Mugunghwa Medal (highest honor), President of Republic of Korea Government

1894 births
1965 deaths
Korean politicians
Korean journalists